Eric Phillips may refer to:

Eric Phillips (athlete) (born 1954), Venezuelan Olympic sprinter
Eric G. Phillips, founder and CEO of Phillips enterprise
Eric Phillips, a character on the soap opera Home and Away